Bruce Harwood (born April 29, 1963) is a Canadian character actor  best known for his role of John Fitzgerald Byers, one of The Lone Gunmen on the television series The X-Files. In addition to The X-Files, Harwood portrayed Byers in the spin-off series The Lone Gunmen, which aired thirteen episodes in 2001. He has also played other roles with a strong similarity to Byers, such as Willis, a technician from the Phoenix Foundation in MacGyver, and government-scientist-turned-conspiracy-theorist Dr. Avery Strong in The Outer Limits. He was a founding member of the Vancouver summer Shakespeare festival, Bard on the Beach. He also starred in the 1988 movie Earth Star Voyager.

Filmography

Film

Television

References

External links
 

1963 births
Living people
Canadian male film actors
Canadian male television actors
Male actors from British Columbia
People from North Vancouver
20th-century Canadian male actors
21st-century Canadian male actors